David Chang (born 1977) is an American restaurateur, author, and television personality.

David Chang may also refer to:
David S. Chang (born 1980) is an American executive 
 David Chang, pleaded guilty to violating federal election laws regarding the Robert Torricelli campaign

See also
David Chiang (born 1947), Hong Kong actor, director and producer